Imyanovo (İmän) is a rural locality (a village) in Uryush-Bittulinsky Selsoviet, Karaidelsky District, Bashkortostan, Russia. The population was 4 as of 2010. There is 1 street.

Geography 
Imyanovo is located 52 km southwest of Karaidel (the district's administrative centre) by road. Uryush-Bittulino is the nearest rural locality.

References 

Rural localities in Karaidelsky District